The Twelve Sexual Commandments of the Revolutionary Proletariat was an influential work by the Soviet psychologist Aron Zalkind, published in 1924. It was devoted to the issues of streamlining the personal lives of men and women in the USSR on the basis of class and proletarian ethics. The prevalent doctrine prior to its publication was the Glass of water theory, which was heavily criticized by Zalkind. The Commandments effectively replaced it in the official Soviet ideology.

Content

History 
A. B. Zalkind attached great importance to the sexual question in issues of the hygiene of party work. He believed that modern man in everyday life suffers from sexual fetishism, which should be overcome with the help of science and that sex should be returned to the right track: "It is necessary that the collective is more attracted to itself than to a love partner." It was in this way that The Twelve Sexual Commandments of the Revolutionary Proletariat were born. The general meaning of these sexual commandments was to ensure that the energy of the proletariat, as an integral class, was not wasted on sexual relations that are useless for its historical mission.

References

Literature

See also 
 Glass of water theory
Sex laws
Sexuality in the Soviet Union